Roger Basy was one of two people to be the first recorded Members Of Parliament for the constituency of York. He was elected during the reign of Edward I.

Life and politics

He was elected in 1294 to serve in the Parliament of 1295.

Prior to this he had served the city of York as a Bailiff in 1277 and as the eighteenth Mayor in 1290. He is credited with the founding of one of two chantries in St Mary Bishophill. He was reported to have befriended Edward I during the King's stay in York and Cawood following the campaigns in Scotland. In 1292 he gave a messuauge, or more commonly known as a plot of land with a dwelling and outbuildings, in Skeldergate to the Selby Abbey.

His son Roger inherited the manor at Bilbrough to the west of the city of York from his father. Bilbrough Manor had been given to Roger by Sir Simon de Chauncy.

Roger Basy, and another citizen named as John Sampson, benefited from the results of the Statute of the Jewry during Edward I reign, when, on 15 November 1279, Queen Eleanor granted them the land and buildings in Coney Street where there was one of two possible synagogues in York.

References

Politicians from York
Members of the Parliament of England for constituencies in Yorkshire
English MPs 1294
English MPs 1297
13th-century births